Rosewood refers to a number of richly hued timbers.
Rosewood may also refer to:

Events
 Rosewood massacre, a 1923, violent, racially motivated conflict in rural Levy County, Florida, United States

Art, entertainment, and media
 Rosewood (album), a 1978 album by jazz trumpeter Woody Shaw
 Rosewood (film), a 1997 film directed by John Singleton, about the 1923 Rosewood massacre
 Rosewood (TV series), an American television series

Enterprises
 Rosewood Center, also known as Rosewood State Hospital, a state-run institution in Owings Mills, Maryland, for the mentally handicapped and mentally ill
 Rosewood Hotels & Resorts, a luxury hotel company based in Hong Kong and Los Angeles
 Rosewood Hotel Group, parent company of Rosewood Hotels & Resorts. Also owned New World and penta brands

Plants and plant extracts
 Rosewood, a common name for shrubs of the genus Vauquelinia (these do not yield wood)
 Rosewood oil, a valuable essential oil, extracted from the wood of Aniba rosaeodora
 African rosewood, several species

Colour
 Rosewood was one of the original colours of pink Cadillacs, along with desert sand

Geography

Australia
 Rosewood, Queensland, a town
 Rosewood, New South Wales, a village community in the south east part of the Riverina

Canada
 Rosewood, Saskatoon, a neighbourhood

United States
 Rosewood, California (disambiguation), multiple locations
 Rosewood, Florida, site of the Rosewood massacre
 Rosewood, Indiana
 Rosewood, Kentucky
 Rosewood Township, Chippewa County, Minnesota
 Rosewood, Minnesota
 Rosewood, Missouri
 Rosewood, North Carolina
 Rosewood, Ohio
 Rosewood, Wisconsin

Fictional places 
 Rosewood, Pennsylvania, a fictional setting of the television series Pretty Little Liars
 Rosewood, a borough of the fictional Rockport City in the 2005 video game Need for Speed: Most Wanted

See also
 Rosenholz files, or "rosewood files", a collection of files with information on employees of one of the intelligence agencies of the former GDR